Angostura trifoliata is a plant native to South America. The leaves are composed of three ovoid lanceolate leaflets. The flowers are purplish-white.
 
Angostura bark is used in the treatment of fevers, where it is believed to be as effective as quinine. It is also used in a number of aromatic bitters, such as Abbott's Bitters and Fever-Tree aromatic tonic water; however, it is not used in Angostura brand bitters, which is instead named after a town in Venezuela, now Ciudad Bolívar. This plant is used to flavor foods like candy and ice cream.

The bark is bruised and used to intoxicate fish.

References

trifoliata